Kwak Sang-hoon (October 21, 1896 – January 19, 1980) was a South Korean independence activist and politician who served as the 1st to 5th National Assembly member and served as acting president of South Korea for 7 days.

Early life 
Kwak Sang-hoon was born on October 21, 1896 in Dongnae-gun in the South Gyeongsang Province as the son of a military officer. His grandfather served as a military officer and served as a lieutenant colonel in Yeoju-gun, and the head of the middle army and the house of the middle army.

References 

1896 births
1980 deaths
Korean independence activists
South Korean politicians
Acting presidents of South Korea
Speakers of the National Assembly (South Korea)